Thomas Alexander Lammonby (born 2 June 2000) is an English cricketer. He made his Twenty20 debut on 20 July 2019, for Somerset in the 2019 T20 Blast. Prior to his T20 debut, Lammonby was named in England's squad for the 2018 Under-19 Cricket World Cup, but was ruled out of the tournament after breaking his hand. He made his first-class debut on 1 August 2020, for Somerset in the 2020 Bob Willis Trophy.

Lammonby scored his maiden century in  his fourth first-class match, against Gloucestershire at Taunton. He followed it up with centuries against Worcestershire and, in the Bob Willis Trophy final, Essex. In the 2021 T20 Blast, Lammonby scored a "freewheeling" 90 runs off only 36 balls to help Somerset to a 23-run win over Gloucestershire. In April 2022, he was bought by the Manchester Originals for the 2022 season of The Hundred.

References

External links

2000 births
Living people
Cricketers from Exeter
English cricketers
English cricketers of the 21st century
Devon cricketers
Somerset cricketers
Manchester Originals cricketers
Hobart Hurricanes cricketers
Karachi Kings cricketers